Alfred Hitchcock's Mystery Magazine (AHMM) is a bi-monthly digest size fiction magazine specializing in crime and detective fiction.  AHMM is named for Alfred Hitchcock, the famed director of suspense films and television.

History
AHMM was founded in 1956 by HSD Publications, which licensed the use of the director's name.  Though there was no formal connection with the television show, stories published in the magazine were sometimes adapted by the producers of Alfred Hitchcock Presents (and later, The Alfred Hitchcock Hour). A few writers, such as Henry Slesar, wrote for both. Other contributors during the magazine’s early years included Evan Hunter/Ed McBain, Ed Lacy, Bill Pronzini, Jim Thompson, Donald E. Westlake and Charles Willeford (who briefly worked for the magazine, as did Patricia Hitchcock, Alfred's daughter).

In 1975, AHMM was acquired by Davis Publications, and since 1992 it has been published by Dell Magazines (which also produces its sister publication, Ellery Queen's Mystery Magazine). Cathleen Jordan edited the magazine from 1981 to 2002, and since then it has been edited by Linda Landrigan. After EQMM, AHMM is the second-longest-running mystery fiction magazine. In 2006, the magazine celebrated its 50th anniversary with the publication of the anthology Alfred Hitchcock’s Mystery Magazine Presents Fifty Years of Crime and Suspense.

Black Orchid
In 2007, AHMM joined with The Wolfe Pack, a society founded in 1978 to celebrate the Nero Wolfe stories of Rex Stout, to sponsor the Black Orchid Novella Contest for stories in the “classic detective” style of Stout’s Nero Wolfe.

Content
Each issue contains original works of short crime or mystery fiction, as well as a book review column (“Booked & Printed”), a puzzle, a “Mysterious Photograph” story contest, and a "Mystery Classic" reprint.

Authors
Over its history AHMM has published short fiction by noted mystery novelists such as Robert Bloch, Lawrence Block, G. K. Chesterton, Ron Goulart, Dorothy L. Sayers, and Donald E. Westlake.  The magazine has also regularly featured such short story specialists as John H. Dirckx, Kenneth Gavrell, Edward D. Hoch, Jack Ritchie, and Stephen Wasylyk.

Many writers have published their first mystery story in AHMM, including Mitch Alderman, Doug Allyn, Gregory Fallis, Steve Hockensmith, Martin Limón, D. A. McGuire, J. R. Parsons and I. J. Parker.

In recent years, regular contributors have also included Rhys Bowen, Jan Burke, O'Neil De Noux, John F. Dobbyn, Joan Druett, Brendan DuBois, Loren D. Estleman, David Edgerley Gates, Toni L. P. Kelner, R. T. Lawton, Robert Lopresti, Beverle Graves Myers, Jas R. Petrin, Anthony Rainone, Stephen Ross, Gilbert M. Stack, Marianne Wilski Strong, Steven Torres, Elaine Viets, James Lincoln Warren, Sarah Weinman, Mike Wiecek and Angela Zeman.

Awards
AHMM stories have won almost every major mystery award, including The Edgar Award for Best Short story, presented by the Mystery Writers of America; the Robert L. Fish Award for Best First Short Story; the Agatha Award for Best Short Story, presented at the Malice Domestic conference; and the Shamus Award for Best P.I. Short Story, presented by the Private-Eye Writers of America.

See also
Alfred Hitchcock's Anthology, a spin-off magazine consisting of AHMM reprints

References

External links
 Alfred Hitchcock's Mystery Magazine official website
 Trace Evidence: AHMM official blog
 index to Alfred Hitchcock's Mystery Magazine (US edition)
 index to companion magazine Alfred Hitchcock's Anthology

Alfred Hitchcock
Monthly magazines published in the United States
Magazines established in 1956
Magazines published in New York City
Mystery fiction magazines
Mystery fiction digests
Penny Publications magazines
1956 establishments in New York (state)